This is a list of episodes of the Dragnet television series that began in 2003. For the second season, the title was altered to L.A. Dragnet. The last two episodes (#21 and #22) first aired in France, the series having been canceled in the United States before they could air.

Series overview

Episodes

Season 1 (2003)

Season 2 (2003–04)

References
 

2003
Dragnet (2003 series)
Dragnet (2003 series)